Zhao Qi may refer to:

Zhao Qi (Han dynasty) (died 201), official of the Han dynasty
Emperor Duzong (1240–1274), personal name Zhao Qi, emperor of the Song dynasty
Zhao Qi (Investiture of the Gods), fictional character from the novel Investiture of the Gods